Chin Tiki was a tiki-themed supper club, nightclub and banquet hall in Detroit, Michigan owned by Marvin Chin. It closed in 1980 but was not demolished until 2009.

History
The Chin Tiki saw construction begin in 1965, but did not open until 1967. A former engineer for Ford, Chin designed the restaurant himself, and had a hand in most of the construction. Inspired by the burgeoning Tiki culture fad of the 1950s and 1960s, the first floor restaurant was ornately decorated "with towering tiki statues, waterfalls and a bamboo bridge." It also featured a large black light aquarium mural. The drink menu included well known tiki drinks such as the Sharks Tooth, Head Hunter, and Fog Cutter, as well as the Chin Tiki Punch and the Chin Tiki Special, which was a communal drink meant for sharing, served in a large clam shell with long straws, and described as "a fusing of fine rums, brandy, liqueurs and fresh fruit juices crowned with a gardenia".

The second floor housed a spacious nightclub with an even larger waterfall, imitation rock walls and a rattan covered stage. The Chin Tiki hosted live music and an authentic Polynesian floor show with Hawaiian dancers and fire-breathers. The restaurant was said to be frequented by such celebrities as Muhammad Ali, Barbra Streisand and Joe DiMaggio.

One of Chin's early competitors was the other large Detroit area Tiki restaurant named the Mauna Loa, but it was short lived.

Following Detroit's economic downturn, Chin shuttered Chin Tiki in 1980, where it remained untouched for two decades and was deemed "a Tiki tomb, a time capsule," by local tiki enthusiasts.  However, after Chin died in 2006 his family quickly sold the building to Olympia Development LLC, owned by Detroit mogul Mike Ilitch and family. The building was torn down in 2009.

Port O' Three 
Marvin Chin also owned the Port O' Three Tiki restaurant in nearby Bloomfield Hills, MI. Its menu and signage used many of the same graphics as the Chin Tiki and used the same cocktail menu.  The name came from his "three types of food" concept for the restaurant which he advertised for on his matchbooks: "Marvin Chin proudly presents a new concept in dining. A unique combination of sea food, Polynesian, and Japanese cuisine under one roof....", but the restaurant stayed in business for only a short period of time.

Chin's is a small Cantonese restaurant in Livonia, MI that is decorated with some of the Chin Tiki's former statues.

In popular culture 
The Chin Tiki was later famous for being a film location for the movie 8 Mile. The unique look of the building had gotten the attention of production designer Phil Messina, who had Universal Studios contact Chin to contract the use of his facility for the filming. The renewed interest had fueled speculation for a short period of time that the restaurant would reopen.

See also
 History of the Chinese Americans in Metro Detroit

References

Tiki culture
Demolished buildings and structures in Detroit
Tiki bars
Defunct restaurants in the United States
1967 establishments in Michigan
1980 disestablishments in Michigan
Buildings and structures completed in 1967
Restaurants established in 1967
Buildings and structures demolished in 2009
Restaurants disestablished in 1980